"Celebrate the Rain" is a song recorded by Dutch house producer Sidney Samson featuring vocals from Dutch singer Eva Simons. It marks as Sidney and Eva's first collaboration. An official music video was released which features Eva and Sidney standing in a desert with pyramid shapes in the background. It was filmed in black and white.

On May 15, 2014 a bootleg was released by electro and progressive house DJ Schooki. The bootleg was supported by Spinnin' Records.

Composition
Dancerebels.com described the track as a progressive house song and a departure from Sidney's "big electro" tracks that featured "grimy Dutch house sounds".

Track listing and format

Weekly Charts

References

2014 songs
Spinnin' Records singles
Songs written by Eva Simons